In aerospace, Assembly, Test, and Launch Operations (ATLO), also known as Mission System Integration and Test (MSIT) is the phase of a spacecraft project that comprises building the spacecraft, testing it, and getting it launched.

References 

Aerospace engineering